Rodolfo Pérez "Rudy" Hernández (April 14, 1931 – December 21, 2013) was a United States Army soldier who received the Medal of Honor — America's highest military decoration — for his actions on May 31, 1951, during the UN May–June 1951 counteroffensive in the Korean War. Despite his severe wounds, Hernández took actions during an enemy counterattack near Wonton-ni that allowed his platoon to retake their defensive position.

Early life and education
Hernández, was an American of Mexican descent. He was one of eight children born to a farmworker in Colton. At a young age his family moved to Fowler, California, where he received his primary education. In 1948, when he was 17 years old, he joined the United States Army with his parents' consent.

After completing his basic training, Hernández volunteered for paratrooper school. Upon the completion of his paratrooper training he was sent to Germany, where he was stationed until the outbreak of the Korean War.

Korean War
On August 27, 1950, the 187th Airborne Infantry Regiment was reorganized and redesignated as the 187th Airborne Regimental Combat Team. The unit was quickly sent to Korea. The 187th Airborne performed operations into Munsan-ni Valley, and fought bloody battles at Inje and Wonton-ni.

Hernández was reassigned to Company G of the 2nd Battalion, 187th Airborne Regimental Combat Team. His platoon was ordered to defend Hill 420, located near Wonton-ni. On May 31, 1951, his platoon was the object of a numerically superior enemy counterattack. A close-quarters firefight broke out when enemy troops surged up the hill and inflicted numerous casualties on the platoon. Hernandez was wounded during the attack, but was able to fire upon the rushing enemy troops. After a cartridge in his rifle ruptured, he continued attacking the enemy with his bayonet. His attack enabled his comrades to regroup and take back the hill.

A grenade explosion that blew away part of his brain knocked him unconscious. Hernández, who had received grenade, bayonet, and bullet wounds, appeared dead to the first medic who reached him, Keith Oates. Oates realized, however, that Hernandez was still alive when he saw him move his fingers. Hernandez woke up a month later in a military hospital, unable to move his arms or legs or to talk.

On April 12, 1952, President Harry S. Truman bestowed upon Hernández the Medal of Honor in a ceremony held in the White House Rose Garden.

After many surgeries and physical therapy over a five-year period, Hernández regained limited use of his right arm and learned to write with his left hand.

Medal of Honor
Hernandez's Medal of Honor citation reads:

Later life

Hernández married and had three children. He retired from a job at the Veterans Administration and lived in Fayetteville, North Carolina. The Carteret County Veterans Council named Hernandez one of two grand marshals of its November 11, 2006, annual Veterans Day Parade held in downtown Morehead City. On November 10, 2007, he was again co-grand marshal of the Morehead City Veterans Day Parade. During the event, he was reunited with his rescuer "from a long and far away battlefield," the former Korean War Army medic and current Morehead City resident, Keith Oates.

Hernández was also the Grand Marshal of the 2012 North Carolina Memorial Day Parade and Ceremony held each Memorial Day in Thomasville, North Carolina, and attended as an honored guest in 2013.

Death
Hernández died at Womack Army Medical Center in Fayetteville on December 21, 2013. He had been battling "cancer and several other ailments" in the last month of his life.

Military decorations and awards
Hernández's military awards include:

Foreign unit decorations

See also

List of Korean War Medal of Honor recipients
List of Hispanic Medal of Honor recipients

References

1931 births
2013 deaths
United States Army soldiers
Korean War recipients of the Medal of Honor
United States Army Medal of Honor recipients
United States Army personnel of the Korean War
People with traumatic brain injuries
American people of Mexican descent
People from Colton, California
People from Fowler, California
People from Fayetteville, North Carolina